Minister of State for Overseas Territories, Commonwealth, Energy, Climate and Environment is a mid-level position in the Foreign, Commonwealth and Development Office in the British government.

History
The office was known as Minister of State for Asia and the Pacific under Mark Field and Parliamentary Under-Secretary of State for Asia and the Pacific from Henry Bellingham to Alok Sharma and under Heather Wheeler. The office was known as Minister of State for Asia under Nigel Adams and Amanda Milling and later Minister of State for Minister of State for Asia and the Middle East when it was held by Milling.

Responsibilities 
The minister's responsibilities include:

North East Asia and China
South East Asia
Australia, New Zealand and Pacific Islands
energy, climate and environment
global health
Commonwealth
Overseas Territories (including Falkland Islands)

List

Notes

References

See also 

 Foreign, Commonwealth and Development Office
 Secretary of State for Foreign, Commonwealth and Development Affairs
 Minister of State for Europe
 Minister of State for Foreign Affairs (United Kingdom)
 Under-Secretary of State for Foreign Affairs
 Minister of State for Middle East and North Africa

Foreign, Commonwealth and Development Office
United Kingdom–Asian relations
Lists of government ministers of the United Kingdom
Foreign ministers of the United Kingdom